In mathematics, a median algebra is a set with a ternary operation  satisfying a set of axioms which generalise the notions of medians of triples of real numbers and of the Boolean majority function.

The axioms are 
   
     
       
   

The second and third axioms imply commutativity: it is possible (but not easy) to show that in the presence of the other three, axiom (3) is redundant.  The fourth axiom implies associativity.
There are other possible axiom systems: for example the two
  
  
also suffice.

In a Boolean algebra, or more generally a distributive lattice, the median function  satisfies these axioms, so that every Boolean algebra and every distributive lattice forms a median algebra.

Birkhoff and Kiss showed that a median algebra with elements 0 and 1 satisfying  is a distributive lattice.

Relation to median graphs
If this is the case, then the operation  defines a median algebra having the vertices of the graph as its elements.

Conversely, in any median algebra, one may define an interval  to be the set of elements  such that . One may define a graph from a median algebra by creating a vertex for each algebra element and an edge for each pair  such that the interval  contains no other elements. If the algebra has the property that every interval is finite, then this graph is a median graph, and it accurately represents the algebra in that the median operation defined by shortest paths on the graph coincides with the algebra's original median operation.

References

External links
 Median Algebra Proof

Algebra
Ternary operations